Hanks' salts is a collective group of salts rich in bicarbonate ions, formulated in 1940 by the microbiologist John H. Hanks. Typically, they are used as a buffer system in cell culture media and aid in maintaining the optimum physiological pH (roughly 7.0–7.4) for cellular growth. Due to their poorly reactive nature and small concentration in solution, Hanks' salts are mainly used in media that are exposed to atmospheric conditions as opposed to  incubation. Performing the latter drastically exceeds the buffer capacity of Hanks' salts and may result in cell death.

The recipe according to AATBIO

Table 1. Required components

 Prepare 800 mL of distilled water in a suitable container.
 Add 8 g of NaCl to the solution.
 Add 400 mg of KCl to the solution.
 Add 140 mg of CaCl2 to the solution.
 Add 100 mg of MgSO4-7H2O to the solution.
 Add 100 mg of MgCl2-6H2O to the solution.
 Add 60 mg of Na2HPO4-2H2O to the solution.
 Add 60 mg of KH2PO4 to the solution.
 Add 1 g of D-Glucose (Dextrose) to the solution.
 Add 350 mg of NaHCO3 to the solution.
 Add distilled water until volume is 1 L.

References 

Buffer solutions
Cell culture media